The Bythograeidae are a small family of blind crabs which live around hydrothermal vents. The family contains 16 species in six genera. Their relationships to other crabs are unclear. They are believed to eat bacteria and other vent organisms. Bythograeidae are a monophyletic, sister taxon of the superfamily Xanthoidea which split to inhabit hydrothermal vents around the Eocene.

Origins 
Due to the lack of fossils found in this group the exact date of origin of Bythograeidae remains unknown. It has been suggested that bythograeidae do not originate from an ancient hydrothermal bathyal groups but instead arose from brachyuran stock that was adapted to shallow hydrothermal vents and then transitioned to deep sea hydrothermal vents around the Eocene.

Distribution 
Bythograeidae are almost exclusively found in the East Pacific Rise. Some exceptions include Austinograea alayseae, Austinograea williamsi and the genus Gandalfus which are found in the western Pacific and Austinograea rodriguezensis which is found only in the Central Indian Ridge.

Ecology 
The hydrothermal vents where these crabs live are typically short lived, lasting from 10 to 100 years. These are extreme environments, with high temperatures, high concentrations of sulphides, heavy metals, carbon dioxide and an acidic environment. At this depth there is also limited access to light making photosynthesis nearly impossible. Instead, organisms rely on Chemosynthetic bacteria to sustain the vast amounts of life in Chemotrophic ecosystems.

Bythograeidae are omnivorous scavengers, they are believed to eat bacteria and other vent organisms however they can also be found far from active sites.

Species
 Genus Allograea Guinot, Hurtado & Vrijenhoek, 2002
 Allograea tomentosa Guinot, Hurtado & Vrijenhoek, 2002
 Genus Austinograea Hessler & Martin, 1989
 Austinograea alayseae Guinot, 1990
 Austinograea hourdezi Guinot & Segonzac, 2018
 Austinograea jolliveti Guinot & Segonzac, 2018
 Austinograea rodriguezensis Tsuchida & Hashimoto, 2002
 Austinograea williamsi Hessler & Martin, 1989
 Genus Bythograea Williams, 1980
 Bythograea galapagensis Guinot & Hurtado, 2003
 Bythograea intermedia Saint Laurent, 1988
 Bythograea laubieri Guinot & Segonzac, 1997
 Bythograea microps Saint Laurent, 1984
 Bythograea thermydron Williams, 1980
 Bythograea vrijenhoeki Guinot & Hurtado, 2003
 Genus Cyanagraea Saint Laurent, 1984
 Cyanagraea praedator Saint Laurent, 1984
 Genus Gandalfus McLay, 2007
 Gandalfus puia McLay, 2007
 Gandalfus yunohana (Takeda, Hashimoto & Ohta, 2000)
 Genus Segonzacia Guinot, 1989
 Segonzacia mesatlantica (Williams, 1988)

References

Crabs
Animals living on hydrothermal vents
Decapod families